Juan Carlos Espinoza Zerón (born 24 August 1958) is a retired Honduran football player, who most recently was assistant manager of Real España in the Liga Nacional de Honduras.

Club career
He started his career at Real España but spent the majority of his career with Olimpia. He also had a short stint at Costa Rican side Alajuelense. He played with Alex Pineda Chacón, Belarmino Rivera, Eugenio Dolmo Flores, Danilo Galindo and his brother Nahúm Espinoza in the Olimpia and they won the CONCACAF Champions League in 1988.

International career
Espinoza made his debut for Honduras in the 1980s and has earned at least 14 caps, scoring 2 goals. He has represented his country in 3 FIFA World Cup qualification match and played at the 1991 UNCAF Nations Cup as well as at the 1991 and 1993 CONCACAF Gold Cups. In the 1991 Gold Cup Final, he missed the decisive penalty.

His final international was a December 1994 friendly match against the United States, a game in which his brother Nahún made his international debut.

International goals
Scores and results list Honduras' goal tally first.

Managerial career
As a manager, he won the 2002 Apertura with Olimpia as well as the 2008 Apertura. In March 2009 he succeeded Colombian Carlos Restrepo at Olimpia.

In September 2012, Juan Carlos was named as assistant to his brother, Nahúm Espinoza, who succeeded Chelato Uclés as manager of Real España while also still being assistant to manager Danilo Tosello at Olimpia.

Personal life
Juan Carlos is the older brother of former international defender Nahúm Espinoza. Their brother Enrique, who died in April 2012, was also a former player of Olimpia.

Honours and awards

Club
C.D. Olimpia
Liga Profesional de Honduras (5): 1984–85, 1987–88, 1989–90, 1992–93, 1995–96
Honduran Cup: (1): 1995
CONCACAF Champions League (1): 1988

C.D. Real Espana
Liga Profesional de Honduras (1): 1980–81

References

External links

 EL sabroso duelo de dos bancas históricas... - El Heraldo 

1958 births
Living people
People from Tela
Association football midfielders
Honduran footballers
Honduras international footballers
1991 CONCACAF Gold Cup players
1993 CONCACAF Gold Cup players
Real C.D. España players
C.D. Olimpia players
L.D. Alajuelense footballers
Liga Nacional de Fútbol Profesional de Honduras players
Liga FPD players
Expatriate footballers in Costa Rica
C.D. Olimpia managers
Honduran football managers